Lionel William "Mick" Ryan (1884 – 6 February 1970) was an Australian politician.

He was born in Bathurst to Thomas and Abigail Ryan. He was a rural worker who was active in the Australian Workers' Union. From 1925 to 1943 he was a Labor member of the New South Wales Legislative Council. He opposed Jack Lang and sat as Federal Labor in the 1930s; he also took an active organisational role in Federal Labor in opposition to Lang Labor in federal and state elections. Ryan died in Croydon in 1970.

References

1884 births
1970 deaths
Australian Labor Party members of the Parliament of New South Wales
Members of the New South Wales Legislative Council
20th-century Australian politicians